Imanol Ezkurdia Ugalde (born 4 January 1999) is a Spanish professional footballer who plays as a central defender for Real Unión, on loan from Real Sociedad.

Club career
Born in Lezo, Gipuzkoa, Basque Country, Ezkurdia joined Real Sociedad's youth setup in 2011, aged 12. He made his senior debut with the C-team during the 2017–18 season, in Tercera División.

Ezkurdia first appeared with the reserves on 10 March 2019, starting in a 1–1 Segunda División B home draw against CD Tudelano. On 5 February 2021, he renewed his contract with the Txuri-urdin until 2023, and was a regular starter the campaign as his side returned to Segunda División after 59 years.

Ezkurdia made his professional debut on 21 August 2021, starting in a 0–0 away draw against CD Lugo. On 28 December, after featuring rarely, he was loaned to Primera División RFEF side Real Unión until June.

References

External links

1999 births
Living people
People from Donostialdea
Sportspeople from Gipuzkoa
Spanish footballers
Footballers from the Basque Country (autonomous community)
Association football defenders
Segunda División players
Segunda División B players
Tercera División players
Real Sociedad C footballers
Real Sociedad B footballers
Real Unión footballers